K. Madhava Menon (20 June 1911 – 4 February 1984) was a painter from Kerala, India. Born in Kodungalloor in Thrissur District Menon had his training from Madras Theosophical Society. He also had training from Shantiniketan under renowned painters Nandalal Bose and Abanindranath Tagore. His paintings mostly used water colour and were particularly known for their naturalistic elements.

Madhava Menon died on February 4, 1984.

External links

People from Thrissur district
1911 births
1984 deaths
20th-century Indian painters
Painters from Kerala